Barbara Klar (born 1966 in Saskatoon, Saskatchewan) is a Canadian poet, who won the Gerald Lampert Award in 1994 for her poetry collection The Night You Called Me a Shadow.

After completing high school, Klar took writing courses at Fort San before completing a degree in English at the University of Saskatchewan. She published poetry in literary magazines such as Grain, Border Crossings and Prairie Fire before The Night You Called Me a Shadow was published in 1993. The book also won the Saskatchewan Writers Guild Poetry Award.

She has since followed up with three further poetry collections, The Blue Field (1999), Tower Road (2004) and Cypress (2008). Both The Blue Field and Cypress were shortlisted for the Saskatchewan Book Award. She won a Joseph S. Stauffer Prize from the Canada Council in 2004.

References

1966 births
20th-century Canadian poets
21st-century Canadian poets
Canadian women poets
Writers from Saskatoon
University of Saskatchewan alumni
Living people
21st-century Canadian women writers
20th-century Canadian women writers